Travis Savoury (born March 6, 1979), professionally known as Baka Not Nice, is a Canadian rapper. He is signed to OVO Sound, the record label co-founded by rapper Drake, producer 40, and Oliver El-Khatib, and Warner Records.

Career
Baka's career began as part of Drake's security team. He went on to contribute background vocals while working on his own solo music.

He can be heard at the end of "From Time" from Drake's 2013 album Nothing Was the Same. He also provided the outro to Drake's "Free Smoke" and backing vocals on "Gyalchester", both from the 2017 album More Life.

On June 27, 2017, he signed to Drake's record label OVO Sound and Warner Records, signing the contract in front of a crowd. Three days later, he released his first single "Live Up to My Name", co-written by Drake. "Live Up to My Name" peaked at number 77 on the Canadian Hot 100.

Personal life 
In 2014, Baka was arrested and charged with forcing a 22-year-old woman into prostitution and taking her money. In 2015, he pleaded guilty to assaulting the woman and an unrelated weapons charge. He was sentenced to six months, but since he had already done 10 months in custody, he did not serve an additional six months.

The woman refused to testify so they had to drop the charges for procuring prostitution and human trafficking. She was working as an escort and had an on-and-off relationship with Baka. She moved from Toronto by the time the trial was underway.

Baka has priors for armed robbery, assault, discharging a firearm while committing a robbery, and possession for the purpose of trafficking. Upon his release, Drake said: "When [he] got out of jail there was a lot of different paths he could've took and he decided to focus on music."

Discography

EPs 
 4Milli (2018) No. 78 Canadian Albums Chart
 No Long Talk (2019)

Singles

Guest appearances

Filmography

References

External links 
 Official website
 

1979 births
Living people
Black Canadian musicians
Canadian male rappers
Musicians from Montreal
OVO Sound artists
Rappers from Toronto
Warner Records artists
21st-century Canadian rappers
21st-century Canadian male musicians